Abdulkadir Doğulu (born 19 April 1982), better known as Kadir Doğulu, is a Turkish actor.

Life
Doğulu was born on 19 April 1982 in Mersin. He worked during his secondary and high school years in many places as a cook and operator. He moved to Istanbul in 2000 to study at Okan University. He met Hande Yener through his brother, Kemal Doğulu, who is Yener's stylist. Soon afterwards, he worked with Hande Yener for a while and appeared in her song's music video called "Romeo". Then he began to receive offers of acting. 

He had a leading role as  Ali (original Nate Archibald) in Küçük Sırlar, a Turkish remake of Gossip Girl. He has played in several successful series. After his first acting experience, Kadir Dogulu took part in youth tv series names Dirty Seven (Pis Yedili). After then, he became the main character in From Fatih to Harbiye (Fatih Harbiye) which is a Turkish drama adapted by famous Turkish novel of Peyami Safa with the same name. He is also well known for bringing to life Mehmet III Giray in 2015 historical drama series Muhtesem Ÿuzyil Kösem alongside actors Beren Saat and Ekin Koç. Another successful tv series he made a starring role are Bana Sevmeyi Anlat (2016 - 2017), Babamin Günahlari (2018),Vuslat (2019-2020), and Aşkin Tarifi (2021).

Kadir Doğulu married actress Neslihan Atagül on 8 July 2016. The couple had met on the set of Fatih Harbiye in 2013.

Filmography

References 

1982 births
Turkish male film actors
Turkish male television actors
People from Mersin
Living people